Tatarsko kyufte is a Bulgarian recipe for a large Kofta. The name references the Tatar people.

See also

Kabab koobideh, Iranian minced meat
Adana kebabı, Turkish minced meat
Kebapche, Bulgarian minced meat
Mititei, Romanian minced meat
Ćevapi, Balkan minced meat

References

Turkish cuisine
Bulgarian cuisine
Crimean cuisine